Makalero or Maklere is a Papuan language spoken in the Lautém district of East Timor. It was previously considered to be a dialect of Makasae, but is nowadays seen as a separate language, both by its speakers and linguists.

Phonology

The data in this section are from Huber (2017).

Consonants

Makalero has 11 native consonant phonemes.

Vowels

Monophthongs
Makalero has five vowel phonemes. Most long vowels occur in predictable contexts; thus Huber argues long vowels are marginal phonemes at best.

Syllables are commonly CV; some are CVC. Epenthetic vowels are often inserted between series of two consonants, and echo vowels are often added to the end of phonological phrases.

Grammar
All information in this section is from Huber 2011.

Lexical Categories

Makalero does not have a definitive noun/verb distinction. Nearly all content words can be heads of NPs as well as predicates. In the following examples, isit can be a predicate or a nominal.

{| 
|asi-atupusi||hai||nomo||isit
|-
|-belly||||||ill
|-
|colspan=6|'my belly did not hurt anymore'
|}

{| 
|Ki-isit=ee||hai||k-ua-misa
|-
|-ill=||||-on.top:-go.up
|-
|colspan=6|'His illness got worse' (lit. went up on top)
|}

Content words must be bimoraic, unlike function words, which may be monomoraic.

Valency

Makalero has only avalent verbs and divalent verbs. There are no trivalent verbs; instead, biclausal constructions are used.

The avalent verbs are adverbial verbs such as atanana 'first,' hana’e 'a long time ago,' aire’ 'now,' kamunei 'tomorrow,' mu’it 'for a long time,' raine’ 'last night,' and tone’ 'maybe.'

Divalent verbs allow for a subject and either an object or complement.

In the following example, Kiloo is the subject and ani is the object.

{| 
|Kiloo||ani||pase
|-
|||||beat
|-
|colspan=6|'He beat me'
|}

In the following example, ani is the subject and rau-rau is the complement.

{| 
|Ani||mei=ni||rau-rau-kena
|-
|||take=||-good-see:
|-
|colspan=6|'I see it very well'
|}

Numerals
unu - One
loloi - Two
lolitu - Three
faata - Four
lima - Five
douhu - Six
fitu - Seven
afo - Eight
siwa - Nine
ruru-u - Ten
 ruu resi nu - Eleven
 ruu resi loloi - Twelve
 ruu resi lolitu - Thirteen
 ruu resi faata - Fourteen
 ruu resi lima - Fifteen

Notes

References

External links
 Makasai at The Language Archive

Oirata–Makasai languages
Languages of East Timor
Articles citing ISO change requests